John Henry Harward (27 May 1858 – 30 September 1932) was a British educationist and Principal of Royal College Colombo (1892–1902).

Born in Wirksworth, Derbyshire, he was educated at Durham School (1869–1877) and University College, Oxford (1878–1881) and graduated B.A. First in classical Moderations.

Starting a career in teaching he became the second classics Master at Brighton College (1882–1891). In 1892 he was appointed Principal of Royal College Colombo till 20 August 1902. Concurrently he acted as Director of Public Instruction (1898–1902) while being principal and was Director of Public Instruction January 1903 to 1915.

On retirement he settled down in Warwick, Queensland, Australia.

References

1858 births
1932 deaths
British educational theorists
People from British Ceylon
People educated at Durham School
Alumni of University College, Oxford
Principals of Royal College, Colombo
People from Wirksworth
Translators of Ancient Greek texts
British scholars of ancient Greek philosophy
Translators of philosophy
19th-century British translators